Von Donop is a German surname. Notable people with the surname include:

Carl von Donop (1732–1777), Hessian soldier who fought in the American Revolutionary War
Georg von Donop (1767–1845), German statesman and historian
Pelham George von Donop (1851–1921), British soldier and Chief Inspector of Railways
Sir Stanley Brenton von Donop (1860–1941), British soldier who became Master-General of the Ordnance

See also
Von Donop Marine Provincial Park, now Háthayim Marine Provincial Park, a provincial park in British Columbia

Surnames of German origin